Highway 688 is a highway in the west-central region of the Canadian province of Saskatchewan.

Highway 688 begins at Highway 17 on the Alberta side of the border and heads in an easterly direction towards Lone Rock, Saskatchewan. From Marshall, the highway continues north until its northern terminus at Highway 303.

See also 
Roads in Saskatchewan
Transportation in Saskatchewan
List of Alberta provincial highways

References 

688